Psary  is a village in the administrative district of Gmina Sławno, within Opoczno County, Łódź Voivodeship, in central Poland.

References

Psary
Radom Governorate
Kielce Voivodeship (1919–1939)
Łódź Voivodeship (1919–1939)